Smith may refer to:

People and fictional characters
 Metalsmith, or simply smith, a craftsman fashioning tools or works of art out of various metals 
 Smith (given name)
 Smith (surname), a family name originating in England
 List of people with surname Smith, including fictional characters
 Smith (artist) (born 1985), French visual artist

Arts and entertainment

 Smith (band), an American rock band 1969–1971
 Smith (EP), by Tokyo Police Club, 2007
 Smith (play), a 1909 play by W. Somerset Maugham
 Smith (1917 film), a British silent film based on the play 
 Smith (1939 film), a short film 
 Smith!, a 1969 Disney Western film
 Smith (TV series), a 2006 American drama 
 Smith, a 1932 novel by Warwick Deeping
 Smith, a 1967 novel by Leon Garfield and a 1970 TV adaptation

Places

North America
 Smith, Indiana, U.S.
 Smith, Kentucky, U.S.
 Smith, Nevada, U.S.
 Smith, South Carolina, U.S.
 Smith Village, Oklahoma, U.S.
 Smith Park (Middletown, Connecticut), U.S., a public park
 Smith Pool, Salem, Massachusetts, U.S.
 Smith, Alberta, Canada
 Smith Sound, between Greenland and Canada
 Smith Sound, Newfoundland and Labrador, Canada
 Smith Sound (British Columbia), Canada
 Smith County (disambiguation)
 Smith Township (disambiguation)
 Fort Smith (disambiguation)

Antarctica
 Smith Bluffs, Ellsworth Land
 Smith Cliff, Ellsworth Land
 Smith Glacier, Marie Byrd Land
 Smith Heights, Oates Land
 Smith Islands, Wilkes Land
 Smith Knob, Ellsworth Land
 Smith Nunatak, Mac. Robertson Land
 Smith Nunataks, two nunataks in Palmer Land
 Smith Peaks, Mac. Robertson Land
 Smith Peninsula, Palmer Land
 Smith Ridge, Ellsworth Land
 Smith Rocks, Mac. Robertson Land
 Mount Smith, north of Mawson Glacier, Scott Coast

In space
 Smith (lunar crater), on the Moon
 Smith (Martian crater), on Mars

Other places
 Smith, Buenos Aires, Carlos Casares Partido, Argentina
 Smith Volcano, Philippines

Businesses and organisations
 Smith (advertising agency), an American advertising agency
 Smith Automobile Company, an early United States automobile manufacturing company 1902–1912
 Smith's Bank, a British bank
 Smith Electric Vehicles, a manufacturer of electric trucks
 Smith International, a gas and oil industry services company, now merged with Schlumberger
 Smith's Food and Drug, an American grocery chain
 The Smith's Snackfood Company, an Australian snack food company owned by PepsiCo
 WHSmith, or Smith's, a British retailer
 DS Smith, a British packaging manufacturer
 SmithGroup is an international architectural, engineering and planning firm
 Smiths Group, a British engineering company
 Smith College, in Northampton, Massachusetts, U.S.

Other uses
 Smith Act, a United States federal statute
 Smith Tower, in Seattle, Washington, U.S.

See also
 Smiths (disambiguation)
 Smithfield (disambiguation)
 Smithland (disambiguation)
 Smithville (disambiguation)
 Smithers (disambiguation)
 Smith Center (disambiguation)
 Smyth, a surname
 R. v. Smith, the name of several court cases
 Smith Square, in Westminster, London, England